Tatyana Shramok is a Belarusian football midfielder, currently playing for Lehenda Chernihiv in the Ukrainian League. She has taken part in the Champions League with Bobruichanka and Lehenda, and she is a member of the Belarusian national team.

References

1982 births
Living people
Belarusian women's footballers
Expatriate women's footballers in Ukraine
Belarusian expatriate sportspeople in Ukraine
WFC Lehenda-ShVSM Chernihiv players
Women's association football midfielders
Belarus women's international footballers
Bobruichanka Bobruisk players
FC Minsk (women) players
WFC Zhytlobud-1 Kharkiv players